The Fighting Cocks is a music venue built prior to 1890,, active since the 1930s and located in Kingston upon Thames, the administrative center of the Royal Borough of Kingston, southwest London, England.,,, Historically, it specializes in Rock'n'roll, Punk, Metal, Folk, Ska, Alternative, Rockabilly, Electro (music), Comedy, & Cabaret performances. It was conspicuous for hosting touring Jazz acts in the late 1930s and in the 1940s.,, It is now a standard on the London Live Circuit. It was a popular watering hole, and host to many jam sessions including such artists as Eric Clapton, CBE, Shirley Collins, Frank Turner, Gallows, The Stupids, June Tabor or The Rolling Stones. Since 1992, it is also a live-audience training platform and term assessments venue for Kingston University's Drama and Music students.,,

History 
Unsigned, underground, as well as established artists have been invited to perform. The last management of the Cocks opened its doors in 2000. The Fighting Cocks is cooperating with Banquet Records promoters based a few minutes walk away in the city center, formerly part of the Beggars Banquet Records retail chain. Banquet Records is also home to Gravity DIP music management.

Comedy performers 
The music venue has a long history of comedy performers especially since it has transformed into the award-winning Outside the Box comedy night on Mondays. Comedians who have performed there include:

Music performers 
Past performers include:

Sources

External links
 The Fighting Cocks on Instagram.
 The Fighting Cocks at Time Out.
 The Fighting Cocks at Mayor of London's 'Visit London'.

Comedy clubs in the United Kingdom
Music venues in London
Rock music venues